Nigericin is an antibiotic derived from Streptomyces hygroscopicus. Its isolation was described in the 1950s, and in 1968 the structure could be elucidated by X-ray crystallography. The structure and properties of nigericin are similar to the antibiotic monensin. Commercially it is obtained as a byproduct, or contaminant, at the fermentation of Geldanamycin. It is also called Polyetherin A, Azalomycin M, Helixin C, Antibiotic K178, Antibiotic X-464.

Nigericin acts as an H+, K+, Pb2+ ionophore.  Most commonly it is an antiporter of H+ and K+. 

In the past nigericin was used as an antibiotic active against gram positive bacteria. It inhibits the  Golgi functions in Eukaryotic cells. Its ability to induce K+ efflux also makes it a potent activator of the NLRP3 inflammasome

References

External links 
 Commercial supplier of nigericin sodium

Antibiotics
Ionophores
Tetrahydrofurans
Tetrahydropyrans
Primary alcohols
Lactols
Hemiketals
Vicinal diols
Carboxylic acids
Spiro compounds
Ketals